Mikasa may refer to:

Places
 Mikasa, Hokkaido, Japan
 Mikasa Park, in Yokosuka, Kanagawa, Japan
 Mount Wakakusa or Mount Mikasa, a mountain in Nara, Japan

People
The princely house of Mikasa-no-miya within the Imperial House of Japan:
 Takahito, Prince Mikasa (1915–2016)
 Yuriko, Princess Mikasa (born 1923)
 Prince Tomohito of Mikasa (1946–2012)
 Princess Tomohito of Mikasa (born 1955)

Characters
 Mikasa Ackerman, a character in the manga series Attack on Titan all seasons (Shingeki no Kyojin)

Other uses
 Mikasa River, a river of Ōnojō, Fukuoka Prefecture, Japan
 Mikasa Sports, a sporting goods manufacturer
 Japanese battleship Mikasa
 Mount Mikasa, in Nara, Nara Prefecture, Japan
 “Mikasa,” a song by progressive metal band Veil of Maya from their 2015 album Matriarch
 Dorayaki, a Japanese confection known as Mikasa in the Kansai region
 A family of AlphaServer computers

See also
 
 Mi Casa, a house band
 Misaka, surname
 Misaka, Yamanashi, former town in Japan